Nicola Notari was an Italian cinematographer and film director. In 1902 he married director and screenwriter Elvira Notari, and in 1906 they founded  and ran the Naples-based Dora Film company. They had three children including the actor Eduardo Notari.

Selected filmography
 Soldier's Fantasy (1927)
 Italy Has Awakened (1927)

References

Bibliography
 Maristella Cantini. Italian Women Filmmakers and the Gendered Screen. Palgrave Macmillan, 2013.

External links

Year of birth unknown
Year of death unknown
Italian cinematographers
Italian film directors